Memories of the Space Age is a collection of science fiction stories by British writer J. G. Ballard.  It was released in 1988  by Arkham House.  It was published in an edition of 4,903 copies and was the author's first book published by Arkham House.  The stories, set at Cape Canaveral, originally appeared in the magazines Ambit, Fantastic Stories, Fantasy and Science Fiction, Interzone, New Worlds and Playboy.

Contents

Memories of the Space Age contains the following stories:

"The Cage of Sand"
 "A Question of Re-entry"
 "The Dead Astronaut"
 "My Dream of Flying to Wake Island"
 "News from the Sun"
 "Memories of the Space Age"
 "Myths of the Near Future"
 "The Man Who Walked on the Moon"

References

Sources 

 Rossi, Umberto, 2009. "A Little Something about Dead Astronauts”, Science-Fiction Studies, #107, 36:1 (March), pp. 101–120.

External links
The Terminal Collection: JG Ballard First Editions 

1988 short story collections
Short story collections by J. G. Ballard
Arkham House books